Divorced is a 1951 Swedish drama film directed by Gustaf Molander and written by Ingmar Bergman.

Synopsis 
After 20 years of marriage, Gertrude is abandoned by her husband. Feeling both offended and dissatisfied with the situation, she leaves her house and rents a room. The landlady's son is attracted to her and tries to help her out of her loneliness.

Cast
 Inga Tidblad as Gertrud Holmgren
 Alf Kjellin as Dr. Bertil Nordelius
 Doris Svedlund as Marianne Berg
 Hjördis Petterson as Mrs. Lobelius
 Håkan Westergren as P.A. Beckman
 Irma Christenson as Cecilia Lindeman
 Holger Löwenadler as Tore Holmgren
 Marianne Löfgren as Mrs. Ingeborg
 Stig Olin as Hans
 Elsa Prawitz as Elsie
 Birgitta Valberg as Eva Möller
 Sif Ruud as Rut Boman
 Carl Ström as Öhman
 Ingrid Borthen as Dinner guest
 Yvonne Lombard as The young wife

References

External links
 

1951 films
1951 drama films
Swedish drama films
1950s Swedish-language films
Swedish black-and-white films
Films directed by Gustaf Molander
Films with screenplays by Ingmar Bergman
Films scored by Erik Nordgren
1950s Swedish films